Joshua Trachtenberg (1904–1959) was a reform Rabbi based in the United States of America. He had a notable career as a congregational Rabbi and scholarly writer.

Biography
Trachtenberg was born in London but travelled to America at aged three. He received his rabbinical ordination at Hebrew Union College (1936), and went on to serve at multiple congregations. He worked in many areas of Jewish scholarship including a survey of religious conditions in Israel (1951–52), which was sponsored by the Central Conference of American Rabbis and the Union of American Hebrew Congregations.

Trachtenberg was also active in the field of community work. In Easton he was the president of the Jewish Community Council (1939–46), and as an ardent Zionist, he was identified with the Labour Zionist movement.

His most notable work Jewish Magic and Superstition (1939, repr. 1961 and again 2004 with a foreword by Moshe Idel) was his Ph.D. dissertation at Columbia University. From this came another notable work The Devil and the Jews (1943, repr. 1966), which examines the relationship of the medieval conception of antisemitism to the modern variety. The work contrasted with his earlier pieces, such as Consider the Years (1944), that was instead a history of the Easton Jewish community he had presided in.

References

1904 births
1959 deaths
20th-century American rabbis